Toxicocalamus loriae, also known commonly as the Loria forest snake, is a species of venomous snake in the family Elapidae. The species is endemic to New Guinea (including some outlying islands) and occurs in both Western New Guinea (Indonesia) and Papua New Guinea.

Etymology
The specific name, loriae, is in honor of Italian ethnologist Lamberto Loria.

Habitat

Behavior
T. loriae is diurnal and fossorial.

Reproduction
T. loriae is oviparous.

References

Further reading
O'Shea M, Kaiser H (2018). "The taxonomic history of the enigmatic Papuan snake genus Toxicocalamus (Elapidae: Hydrophiinae), with the description of a new species from the Managalas Plateau of Oro Province, Papua New Guinea, and a revised dichotomous key". Amphibia-Reptilia 39 (4): 403–433.
O'Shea M, Parker F, Kaiser H (2015). "A New Species of New Guinea Worm-Eating Snake, Genus Toxicocalamus (Serpentes: Elapidae), From the Star Mountains of Western Province, Papua New Guinea, With a Revised Dichotomous Key to the Genus". Bulletin of the Museum of Comparative Zoology'' 161 (6): 241–264.

loriae
Venomous snakes
Endemic fauna of New Guinea
Snakes of New Guinea
Reptiles of Papua New Guinea
Reptiles of Western New Guinea
Reptiles described in 1897
Taxa named by George Albert Boulenger